was the consort of Emperor Kōmei of Japan. She is also known under the technically incorrect name .

Early life 

As the daughter of Kujō Hisatada, who was a former kampaku, Kujō Asako could anticipate a life unfolding entirely within the ambit of the Imperial court; but she could not have anticipated the vast array of changes which the years would bring during her lifetime.  At age 13, she was matched with Crown Prince Osahito. Upon the death of Emperor Ninkō in 1846, Osahito, who succeeded him as Emperor Kōmei, named her Nyōgo, a consort position of high honor to which princesses of the blood were appointed after the time of Emperor Kammu.

Consort 
Asako had two daughters, who both died in infancy; but she became the official mother of Komei's heir, Crown Prince Mutsuhito, later Emperor Meiji. He developed a strong emotional attachment to her, which became especially important in the unsettled period after Emperor Kōmei died unexpectedly.

Empress dowager
Soon after the death of Emperor Kōmei, his successor Emperor Meiji conferred upon her the title of Empress Dowager; and she was given a posthumous name to go with her new title. This specific posthumous name was taken from the title of a poem, "Purple Wisteria over a Deep Pool," by a T'ang dynasty poet; and it was deemed appropriate for a daughter of the Kujō family as part of the Fujiwara ("Wisteria Field") clan.  
When the Meiji Imperial court relocated from Kyoto to Tokyo, she followed, living first in the Akasaka Palace and then in the Aoyama Palace.

The empress dowager died in 1897 at age 62 and was buried at Senyū-ji, which is in Higashiyama-ku, Kyoto. Her memory is officially honored at her husband's mausoleum in Kyoto, which is known as Nochi-no-tsukinowa no higashiyama no misasagi.

Franz Eckert composed "Trauermarsch" ("Deep mourning" funeral march or "Kanashimi no kiwami") for the funeral of Empress Dowager Eishō.

Emperor Meiji and his wife could not attend the funeral, but they traveled to Kyoto to pay graveside respects in the spring after her death.

Ancestry

See also
 Japanese empresses
 Ōmiya Palace

Notes

References 
 Keene, Donald. (2002).  Emperor of Japan: Meiji and His World, 1852-1912. New York: Columbia University Press. ; OCLC 46731178
 Ponsonby-Fane, Richard Arthur Brabazon. (1959).  The Imperial House of Japan. Kyoto: Ponsonby Memorial Society. OCLC 194887

1835 births
1897 deaths
People from Kyoto
Japanese empresses
Kujō family
19th-century Japanese women

Grand Cordons (Imperial Family) of the Order of the Precious Crown